St. Frances Cabrini Catholic Church is a historic Catholic church building in Omaha, Nebraska, United States.  It was formerly the cathedral of the Diocese of Omaha and was named St. Philomena's Cathedral at that time.  The church and the rectory are listed on the National Register of Historic Places and are also Omaha Landmarks under the St. Philomena name.

History
The Spanish Renaissance Revival style church was built in 1908 as St. Philomena's Cathedral.  It served the Diocese of Omaha as its cathedral church until St. Cecilia's Cathedral was substantially completed in 1916.  The church was designed by Omaha architect Thomas Rogers Kimball.  The name of the church was changed in 1958 to honor the first American citizen to be canonized a saint, Frances Xavier Cabrini.  It was named an Omaha Landmark in 1979 and it was added to the National Register in 1980.

See also
List of Catholic cathedrals in the United States
List of cathedrals in the United States

References

External links
 

Former cathedrals in the United States
Roman Catholic churches completed in 1908
Omaha Landmarks
Roman Catholic churches in Omaha, Nebraska
National Register of Historic Places in Omaha, Nebraska
Churches on the National Register of Historic Places in Nebraska
Thomas Rogers Kimball buildings
1908 establishments in Nebraska
Roman Catholic cathedrals in Nebraska
20th-century Roman Catholic church buildings in the United States